Natural Steps is an unincorporated census-designated place in Pulaski County, Arkansas, United States. Per the 2020 census, the population was 413. Today, it is a small farming community with scattered businesses. Most of the natural steps, a geologic formation, still stand today and are used as a marker for river runners. The Natural Steps are not open to the public for viewing.

Demographics

2020 census

Note: the US Census treats Hispanic/Latino as an ethnic category. This table excludes Latinos from the racial categories and assigns them to a separate category. Hispanics/Latinos can be of any race.

History
The small town was named after "two perfectly parallel vertical walls of sandstone, twenty feet apart, [that] jut out from the disintegrated soft slates, in prominent conformity, descending steplike, fifty-one feet from the top of the bank, where they first show themselves, to the edge of the lowest water-mark of the Arkansas River, and can be seen running their course beneath the stream. These form a conspicuous landmark to boatman and travelers on the Arkansas River, and are known under the name of the "Natural Steps". Beginning in 1822, the local "Natural Steps" provided a convenient stop for Little Rock visitors to disembark for their hike to the mountain."

The Natural Steps were first written about and drawn by David Dale Owen (Principal Geologist) in his Second Report of a Geological Reconnaissance of the Middle and Southern Counties of Arkansas (1859) ordered by Elias Nelson Conway, Governor of Arkansas. He wrote,

In 1870, United States Army Corps of Engineers Col. John Navarre Macomb, along with Assistant Engineer S.T. Abert, set out to map the Arkansas River and show low-water depths and other features important to river travel across the channel. In their maps, a drawing and location of the "Natural Steps" were included.

Native Americans
Fred O. Henker, M.D. wrote, "The first inhabitants of the Natural Steps area were Native Americans, Indians whose presence in the vicinity dates back possibly 10,000 years."
During early European explorations and the colonial period, local Native Americans, from about 1500 to the late 1700s, were the Quapaw, which translates to "down stream people."

Naturalist Thomas Nuttall wrote A Journal of Travels into the Arkansas Territory During the Year 1819 based on his travels from 1819–1821 to study botany along the Arkansas River. He also observed the Quapaw and other Native Americans.  "A number of families were now about to settle, or rather take provisionary possession of the land purchased from the Osage, situated along the banks of the Arkansas, from Frog bayou to the falls of the Verdigris ..." Nuttall's travels took him to the mouth of the Verdigris River.
"
Thomas Nuttall found few Native Americans in the Natural Steps area in 1819.

French Explorers
The Pinnacle Mountain Community Post wrote:

History reveals the French were notorious traders with the Natives and perhaps many canoe or river raft pulled up and tied off in the area.  Word has it that Bernard de la Harpe spent some time in the area.  The French explorers were coming down the river and when they rounded the bend, right near Palarm Creek, they named the twin peaks of Pinnacle Mountain Maumelle, which is French for a woman's breasts.

Steamboat Landing
The Natural Steps used to be famous for boatloads of picnickers that went up and down the Arkansas river in steamboats in the 19th century.  "Natural Steps was a natural port with water at the bank of sufficient depth to enable convenient docking, and sufficient population to provide passengers and cargo.  By 1849 the Arkansas Gazette reported fifteen to twenty steamboat arrivals and departures weekly."

The Arkansas Gazette on May 19, 1878 wrote,

The excursion yesterday to Natural Steps on the steamer Maumelle under the auspices of the M.E. church and the management of its popular pastor, Rev. A.W. Decker, and Gen. Henry Rudd, was a great success, both pecuniarily and pleasurably.  The boat left Little Rock promptly at 8:30 a.m. and after traversing our beautiful river, with its varied and picturesque scenery for about thirty miles duly reached its point of destination, the Natural Steps, where the excursionists disembarked and sought the shady groves in the vicinity, where they indulged in picnicking in the true and time-honored style; after when the Natural Steps were duly inspected and climbed and such getting up stairs you never did see.

A riverboat pilot on the Arkansas River in the late 19th century, R. E. Cross wrote in 1938:

Later, cotton, corn and firewood were shipped from the steamboat landing at Natural Steps.

The Battle of Palarm
This was a battle that began with the Brooks-Baxter War and occurred on the stern wheel steamboat "Hallie" on May 8, 1874.  Palarm is a small community on the north side of the Arkansas River from Natural Steps.

Robert W. Meriwether of the Faulkner County Historical Society wrote:

After stopping at Natural Steps to take on fuel wood, the "Hallie" was proceeding upstream. Suddenly a "terrific volley" of shots was fired at the steamer from behind rocks along the northern (eastern) bank of the river near Palarm. The Hallie Rifles returned the fire. The shooting continued for ten to fifteen minutes. One stray bullet pierced the supply pipe between the vessel's boiler and engine, thus cutting off its power, and the boat drifted downriver, out of gun range, and lodged on the southern (western) shore. The boat's captain, a pilot, and one rifleman were killed; the other pilot and three or four riflemen were wounded. One source stated that the Brooks regiment suffered one man killed and three wounded; another report was that five men were killed and "quite a number" wounded.

Ancient Fort

THE BENEDICT MANUSCRIPT

Written by R.W. Benedict Circa 1880

Courtesy of and Transcribed June 2000
By B. Collins
Great-great-granddaughter of R.W. Benedict.  The family of Mr. Benedict still have the original manuscript, written in the 1800s, in their possession.

The ancient fort has not been located and now it is believed that the fort was likely built by Bernard de la Harpe.

Flood of 1927
This picture was taken of the Great Mississippi Flood of 1927 in Natural Steps.  It shows Natural Steps knee deep in Arkansas River water from this point, all the way to Pinnacle Mountain.  Seen in the background are the Natural Steps train depot, the Moreland commissary and Pinnacle Mountain.

Homes

The Mainard House
Built around 1870, the Mainard House was one of the first homes built in Natural Steps.  "It is a tall house that faces the river and until the flood of 1927 the river ran much closer to the house.  There used to be a gin on the place and boats pulled up there to load and unload cotton."  The home is not open to the public.

The Moreland House
The first Moreland home was built in the 1870s and was nothing more than a shack.  It was later converted into a barn and garage once the new home was built.

Built in the early 1920s by Dr. L.B. Moreland, "The Brick House" became the second Moreland home.  The two story home had 5 bedrooms, 1 bath, living and dining, with a very large basement.  One of the rooms was converted into an office for Dr. Moreland to see patients. Later, an extra bathroom was added on.

Dr. Moreland, who loved orchards, had the home surrounded by peach and apple orchards.  During the Great Mississippi Flood of 1927, the basement of the home was filled with water from the Arkansas River and the only way to get access to the home was by boat.  The picture below, Flood of 1927, was taken from the house.  The house did not survive a fire in the late 1970s.

Train Depot
At one time, Natural Steps had a small train depot off Maple Ave.  "The Memphis and Choctaw Railroad was built through the south edge of town in 1898 with a small station building beside the track."  "Railroad ties, oak, and cypress lumber, and wooden shingles were shipped out on the railroad starting in 1907, from depots at the towns of Pinnacle and Natural Steps.  Several smaller sawmills called "gopher mills" operated in the area, and the timber industry, along with farming, provided the first major work for early residents."  The old depot was destroyed in the early 1900s.

Businesses

One of the oldest running farms in Natural Steps is Moreland Farms.  The family has been farming in the Natural Steps area since the 1870s.  Cotton was the main cash crop when they first started their farming operation and as time went on they moved into soybeans.  The farm, at one time, had a cotton gin, a blacksmith shop, a sawmill, and a commissary along the Rock Island Railroad, but were torn down in 1963.  The commissary was destroyed in the early 1900s.  The Moreland family still farms in the area today.

The commissary was also used as the first post office for the area.  The post office was established on September 6, 1880, with Dr. Duval as postmaster.  However, the post office lasted only thirteen months, closing on October 3, 1881.  A second post office was established on March 15, 1901, with Henry P. Clay as postmaster, succeeded in 1902 by Little Bart Moreland, in 1910 by Walter A. Nowlin, and in 1913 by Little Bart Moreland.  The post office was discontinued on August 31, 1925, with Little Bart Moreland the last postmaster.

Pinnacle Realty, Inc. was started in Natural Steps in 1974 and continues to sell real estate in the area.  Their office is located off Highway 300.

Churches
The Natural Steps Baptist Church was established in 1913 and built beside the Natural Steps Cemetery.  The original church burned in 1962 and was rebuilt along AR 300 where it still stands today.

The Natural Steps Methodist Church was written about by the Arkansas Gazette on November 12, 1936.

The old Methodist Church burned to the ground, in the late 1940s, during a volunteer clean-up day at the Natural Steps Cemetery.  A spark from one of the fires landed on the roof of the church and by the time the locals realized, it was too late.

Cemeteries
Natural Steps Cemetery Est. Sept 1, 1861

Bailor Cemetery African American Cemetery

Education

Currently it is in the Pulaski County Special School District and is zoned to Joe T. Robinson Elementary School, Joe T. Robinson Middle School, and Joe T. Robinson High School.

Historic Bridge
In the 1920s, a one-lane truss bridge was built on the old AR 300 to cross the Little Maumelle River.  It is on the Historic Bridges of the United States (Maumelle River AR 300 Bridge) for Pulaski County, Arkansas.  The bridge still stands in the shadow of Pinnacle Mountain, but was made obsolete by a new bridge in 1981.  Today, it is only open to pedestrians for fishing and is part of the 223 mile long Ouachita National Recreation Trail.

State Park

The Pinnacle Mountain State Park was established as a state park in 1973. "The Fulk family, who owned the largest tract, including Pinnacle Mountain, also supported the plan to establish it as a state park." It is located just south of Natural Steps on Arkansas Highway 300 and is heavily visited by climbers, hikers, and picnickers. The mountain is on the northeast corner of the Ouachita Mountains.

Masonic Stone

The most spectacular gathering at the steps occurred June 28, 1876, when the combined memberships of the Western Star Lodge, Magnolia Lodge, and Mary Williams Lodge came by steamboat and held a joint installation.  A century later, June 27, 1976, the same lodges came by boat and car for a similar ceremony, followed by burial of a time capsule that was to be opened one hundred years hence.  The site is marked by a granite monument bearing the names of worshipful masters of the three lodges.

Legend
In the 1940s, residents of Natural Steps began dynamiting the steps in search of Confederate gold lying beneath the massive stones. The legend is, a Confederate Gunboat was sunk at the natural steps so the Union Army, that just claimed Little Rock, couldn't take possession of the Confederate gold on board.  The thought being, the steps would be a marker for where the gold laid and the Confederates could come back later and reclaim it.  Three Confederate soldiers died in the explosion that sank the gunboat and are buried in the Natural Steps Cemetery.  In the late 19th century, one of the locals, waiting to catch a steamboat at the foot of the steps, found a $5 gold piece. No gold was ever found in the 1940s and the steps were partially destroyed by the dynamite.

Another legend was given to us by Bart Moreland Sr. who was born in Natural Steps.  "The old story goes that Jesse James and his gang spent the night, in Natural Steps, and robbed a stage coach in Benton, on the road to Hot Springs, the next day."  Bart Sr. then said, "Yeah, that was the talk, then, I was born 1899, and it was the 1800s that Jesse James spent the night there." When asked who told him, "Oh, several, my dad and mother for one, or two."  The old cabin that Jesse James was said to have stayed in, no longer exists.
Written in the Pinnacle Mountain Community Post.

The Natural Steps Ghost
On the darkest of nights in late October, a woman in white can be seen walking in the Natural Steps Cemetery. She is first seen in the northeast section of the cemetery where the old Natural Steps Baptist Church sat before it burned.  From there, she is seen heading north into the woods towards the natural steps. Once she arrives at the steps, she follows the rock steps down into the Arkansas River and is never seen again.

The legend is that the woman in white is Martha Sanders. A young bride who lost her husband, Gustavus Sanders, days after their wedding. Gustavus Sanders, died in October 1880 from an unknown disease that took many lives in the small community. But before his death, Gustavus and Martha decided to wed at their favorite meeting spot, at the top of the natural steps, overlooking the Arkansas River. Unfortunately, the  honeymoon was short for the young couple because just days later he was dead and was laid to rest behind the old wooden church. The grief was too great for Martha and after his funeral she just disappeared, never seen again by family or friends. It is believed that she is the woman in white and that she took her life by jumping into the Arkansas River from the Natural Steps.

The woman in white has been seen by a few in the community. The older generations still tell their stories of Gustavus and Martha Sanders.

Gallery

References

External links
Pinnacle Mountain State Park
 The Battle of Palarm
 The Battle of Palarm drawing
 1870 Arkansas River Survey
 1870 Map of the Arkansas River
 Archaeological Digs

Census-designated places in Arkansas
Census-designated places in Pulaski County, Arkansas
Populated places established in 1822
Archaeological sites in Arkansas
Geography of Pulaski County, Arkansas
Landforms of Pulaski County, Arkansas
Arkansas populated places on the Arkansas River
Census-designated places in Little Rock–North Little Rock–Conway metropolitan area
1822 establishments in Arkansas Territory